Siah Mansur (also Romanized as Sīāh Manşūr, Sīyah Mansoor, and Sīyah-mansūr) is a city in Shamsabad Rural District, in the Central District of Dezful County, Khuzestan Province, Iran. At the 2006 census, its population was 4,556, in 922 families.

References 

Populated places in Dezful County
Cities in Khuzestan Province